Isabelle Duncan (2 July 1812 – 26 December 1878) was a British author known for her book which explained scientific theories in terms of the accounts known from the Bible.

Early life
Isabelle Wight was born in Dumfries, Scotland, in 1812. After bearing nine children, she began writing.

Career
She wrote a book, Pre-Adamite man : or, the story of our old planet & its inhabitants, told by Scripture & science, about the creation which combined scientific theories with the stories from Genesis in the Bible. Her Pre-Adamite theory postulated a race of people before Adam which also explained where angels came from. The book was published just after Darwin published On the Origin of Species and after the evidence that mammoths and humans lived at the same time. At that time, the Bible gave evidence that the earth was thousands and not millions of years old. She explained the recent findings from geology but surmising that chapter one of Genesis described a race before Adam and the second chapter described the classical story of biblical creation.

Her husband, a minister, did not agree with the main idea of her book, but he offered his expertise with theology and  created some illustrations. This was uncredited as the book went through many editions by an unknown author.

Isabelle was annoyed that the author was assumed to be male. For later editions, it was published under her name.

Personal life and death
She married George John Craig Duncan who was the minister of Kirkpatrick Durham. They relocated to London. She bore nine children.

Duncan died in Bayswater in 1878.

References

1812 births
1878 deaths
People from Dumfries